In geometry, the Hill tetrahedra are a family of space-filling tetrahedra.  They were discovered in 1896 by M. J. M. Hill, a professor of mathematics at the University College London, who showed that they are scissor-congruent to a cube.

Construction 
For every , let  
be three unit vectors with angle  between every two of them.
Define the Hill tetrahedron  as follows:

A special case  is the tetrahedron having all sides right triangles, two with sides  and two with sides . Ludwig Schläfli studied  as a special case of the orthoscheme, and H. S. M. Coxeter called it the characteristic tetrahedron of the cubic spacefilling.

Properties 
 Every  can be dissected into three polytopes which can be reassembled into a prism.

Generalizations  
In 1951 Hugo Hadwiger found the following n-dimensional generalization of Hill tetrahedra:

 

where vectors  satisfy  for all , and where .  Hadwiger showed that all such simplices are scissor congruent to a hypercube.

References 

 M. J. M. Hill, Determination of the volumes of certain species of tetrahedra without employment of the method of limits, Proc. London Math. Soc., 27 (1895–1896), 39–53. 
 H. Hadwiger, Hillsche Hypertetraeder, Gazeta Matemática (Lisboa), 12 (No. 50, 1951), 47–48.
 H.S.M. Coxeter, Frieze patterns, Acta Arithmetica 18 (1971), 297–310.
 E. Hertel, Zwei Kennzeichnungen der Hillschen Tetraeder, J. Geom. 71 (2001), no. 1–2, 68–77. 
 Greg N. Frederickson, Dissections: Plane and Fancy, Cambridge University Press, 2003.
 N.J.A. Sloane, V.A. Vaishampayan, Generalizations of Schobi’s Tetrahedral Dissection, .

External links 
 Three piece dissection of a Hill tetrahedron into a triangular prism
 Space-Filling Tetrahedra

Polyhedra
Space-filling polyhedra